is a Japanese multinational public industrial holding company that through its subsidiaries is mainly engaged in the manufacture and sale of aluminum and chemical products. It is listed on the Tokyo Stock Exchange and is a constituent of the Nikkei 225.

In 1939 Nippon Light Metal Co. was incorporated jointly by Furukawa Electric and Tokyo Dento (one of the predecessors of the Tokyo Electric Power Company) to start the aluminum smelting and in 2012 Nippon Light Metal Holdings Co., a pure holding company for the former, was established.

Business segments and products 
The Company operates in four business segments:
 Aluminum Ingot and Chemicals
 alumina, aluminum hydroxide, chemical goods, aluminum bullion, aluminum alloys
 Aluminum Sheet and Extrusions
 aluminum sheets and aluminum extrusion products
 Fabricated Products and Others
 processed aluminum products including electronic materials, industrial components, landscape related products 
 transportation-related products including van, truck and trailer bodies, automobile parts
 panels for freezers and refrigerators, solar panel frames, electrode sheets for aluminum electrolytic capacitors, aluminum kegs, panels for clean rooms as well as carbon products (carbon blocks); this once included the Donvier ice cream maker
 Aluminum Foil, Powder and Paste
 aluminum foil for electrolytic capacitors, antennas for IC cards/tags
 solar panel backsheets, conductive inks for solar cell electrodes

References

External links
  
 Nippon Light Metal Company (subsidiary) 
 Toyo Aluminium K.K. (subsidiary) 
 Nikkei Metal Company Ltd. (subsidiary) 

Holding companies based in Tokyo
Manufacturing companies based in Tokyo
Companies listed on the Tokyo Stock Exchange
Chemical companies based in Tokyo
Holding companies established in 2012
Manufacturing companies established in 1939
Japanese companies established in 1939